Jonny Saves Nebrador is a 1953 West German adventure film directed by Rudolf Jugert and starring Hans Albers, Margot Hielscher and Peter Pasetti. The film is set in South America, but was shot on location in Ancona and Rimini, Italy. It was made by Bavaria Film at the company's Munich Studios. The film's sets were designed by the art directors Paul Markwitz and Fritz Maurischat.

Cast
 Hans Albers as Jonny / General Oronta
 Margot Hielscher as Marina
 Peter Pasetti as Lt. Col. Dacano
 Ferdinand Anton as Lt. Articos
 Trude Hesterberg as Madame Dubouche
 Linda Hardt as Rosita
 Al Hoosmann as Totti
 Franz Muxeneder as Paco
 Kurt E. Ludwig as Carlo
 Fritz Benscher as Rubino
 Rudolf Vogel as Major Souza
 Horst Loska as Maracas
 Hans Bergmann as Rastano
 Wolfgang Molander as Captain Tolly
 Karl-Heinz Peters as Major Vinaigle
 Ernst Rotmund as President Dacapo
 Meloani
 Walter Wehner
 Viktor Afritsch
 Johannes Buzalski
 Otto Friebel
 Oliver Hassencamp
 Franz Koch
 Hans Schulz
 Jürgen Krumwiede
 Bum Krüger
 Fritz Lafontaine
 Kurt Lang
 Ernst Legal
 F. Neubert
 Panos Papadopulos
Abdullah Schächly
 Alfons Teuber
 Bobby Todd
 Karl von Malachowsky

See also
 The President (1928)
 The Magnificent Fraud (1939)
 I'm the Capataz (1951)
 Moon over Parador (1988)

References

Bibliography

External links 
 

1953 films
1950s adventure comedy films
German adventure comedy films
West German films
1950s German-language films
Films based on German novels
Films directed by Rudolf Jugert
Films set in South America
Films shot in Italy
Films shot in Germany
Bavaria Film films
1953 comedy films
German black-and-white films
Films shot at Bavaria Studios
1950s German films